Aircraft Data Network (ADN) is a concept introduced by the Airlines Electronics Engineering Committee (AEEC) in the ARINC 664 Specification. The specification proposes data networking standards recommended for use in commercial aircraft installations. The standards provide a means to adapt COTS networking standards to an aircraft environment. It refers to devices such as bridges, switches, routers and hubs and their use in an aircraft environment. This equipment, when installed in a network topology, can provide effective data transfer and overall avionics performance. The ARINC 664 specification refers extensively to the set of data networking standards developed by the
Internet community and IEEE. The specification also applies the concepts of Open Systems Interconnection (OSI) standards.

The specification is organized in multiple parts, as follows:
 Part 1 - Systems Concepts and Overview
 Part 2 - Ethernet Physical and Data-Link Layer Specifications
 Part 3 - Internet-based Protocols and Services
 Part 4 - Internet-based Address Structure and Assigned Numbers
 Part 5 - Network Domain Characteristics and Functional Elements
 Part 6 - Reserved;
 Part 7 - Deterministic Networks
 Part 8 - Upper Layer Protocol Services

External links
 ARINC Web Page

Air traffic control